Xinguanyin Tunnel is located in Taiwan Railways Administration North-link Line, Nan'ao, Yilan County territory. It runs through the Central Mountain Range, and with a total length of 10,307.1 meters, it is the longest mountain railway tunnel in Taiwan.

This tunnel is a one-way section for up to 13.2 km in order to improve the Wuta - Hanben Chisel tunnel. Beigou is located in the south of Wuta station, south of Nanxi South River, south of Hanzhong station north, across the board two-track electrification. As the tunnel is very long, the construction unit in order to save construction time, in addition to excavation on both sides of the north and south, and in the middle of the North vertical pit and South Hang Hang, so all a total of 6 working surface to enhance the construction efficiency. The tunnel was launched in August 2001 and was commissioned in 2003. The track in the tunnel adopts the ballast layout track, which allows the train to pass at a speed of 130 km / h at high speed. After completion, it will greatly enhance the driving efficiency of the north route.

Parallel with the New Guanyin tunnel Guanyin tunnel, Guyin tunnel, Gufeng tunnel and Guanyin signal station, have been abandoned, Reserved for the Yilan County government as Suhua Highway relief with the sidewalk, and later because of Suhua change engineering needs and become a dedicated contact.

References

External links 
 First, the Eastern Railway Improvement Program (85.1.31 ~ 92.7) - Rong Gong Gong Yuan 

2003 establishments in Taiwan
Railway tunnels in Taiwan
Tunnels completed in 2001